Joseph Edward Casey (December 27, 1898 – September 1, 1980) was a United States representative from Massachusetts. Born in Clinton, he attended the public schools,  served as a private in the United States Army at Fort Lee, Virginia, in 1918, and graduated from the Boston University School of Law in 1920. He was admitted to the bar that year and commenced practice in Clinton. He was a delegate to the Democratic National Conventions in 1924, 1932, 1936, 1940, and 1944, and was elected as a Democrat to the Seventy-fourth and to the three succeeding Congresses (January 3, 1935, to January 3, 1943). He was not a candidate for renomination in 1942 to the Seventy-eighth Congress and was an unsuccessful candidate for election to the United States Senate.  He resumed the practice of law in Boston and in Washington, D.C., where he resided until his death. Interment was in Arlington National Cemetery, Section 1, Lot 761-B.

His son is novelist John Casey. His daughter Jane Dudley Casey was the first wife of Pedro Pablo Kuczynski, who later became President of Peru from 2016 to 2018. His granddaughter is journalist and writer Alex Kuczynski.

See also
 List of members of the House Un-American Activities Committee

References

External links
 

1898 births
1980 deaths
United States Army soldiers
Boston University School of Law alumni
Burials at Arlington National Cemetery
People from Clinton, Massachusetts
Democratic Party members of the United States House of Representatives from Massachusetts
20th-century American politicians